Dotidae are a taxonomic family of small sea slugs, nudibranchs, shell-less marine gastropod molluscs formerly assigned to the order Opisthobranchia, but now considered to belong to the clade Dexiarchia.

This family has also been spelled in the past as "Dotonidae" and "Dotoidae". The International Commission on Zoological Nomenclature (ICZN) decided in 1964 that neither spelling was correct and adopted Dotidae  Gray, 1853 as the accepted name for this family.

Distribution
This family occurs worldwide in cold and warm seas.

Genera
Genera within the family Dotidae include:
 Caecinella Bergh, 1870
 Doto Oken, 1815
 Kabeiro Shipman & Gosliner, 2015
 Miesea Marcus, 1961

Synonyms include:
 Gellina Gray, 1850

References

External links
 
 SeaSlugForum overall list
 Photos of Dotidae

 
Taxa named by John Edward Gray
Gastropod families